The South African Railways Class 12 4-8-2 of 1912 was a steam locomotive.

Between April 1912 and 1922, the South African Railways placed all together 46 Class 12 steam locomotives with a  Mountain type wheel arrangement in goods train service.

Manufacturers
Design work commenced in 1910 for a new heavy goods engine for use on the heavy coal service between Witbank and Germiston. The resulting Class 12 was the first locomotive design to originate from the newly established South African Railways (SAR) in 1912. It was, in effect, an enlarged version of the already successful Class 3B which had also been designed by SAR Chief Mechanical Engineer (CME) D.A. Hendrie during his years on the Natal Government Railways.

Orders for the first eight locomotives in the Class were placed on 22 March 1911. They were built in two batches of four, the first of which was delivered from North British Locomotive Company (NBL) in April 1912, numbered in the range from 1494 to 1497. The second batch, numbered in the range from 1498 to 1501, followed shortly thereafter. These first eight locomotives had bogies with a  wheelbase.

These engines were followed by another eight in August 1913, numbered in the range from 1502 to 1509, and ten more in January 1915, numbered in the range from 1510 to 1519, all built by NBL. These and all subsequent Class 12 locomotives had leading bogies with a  wheelbase. These locomotives were also  longer between couplers than the first eight.

In June 1921, Beyer, Peacock and Company (BP) delivered the final twenty Class 12 locomotives, built in two batches of ten and numbered in the range from 1859 to 1878.

Characteristics
When the Class 12 was introduced, it was the largest non-articulated engine in South Africa and possibly in the world on railways of less than  gauge. The first eight locomotives had cast steel frames for the leading bogies with three-point suspension links, similar to those of the Class 3B. On subsequent engines, this arrangement was modified to the two-point swing-link type controlled by laminated side springs, a design Hendrie adhered to in all his later engines.

The locomotives were built with plate frames, Walschaerts valve gear, superheaters and Belpaire fireboxes. It was designed to have as short a fixed wheelbase as possible and the close spacing of the coupled wheels necessitated specially designed brake hangers outside the wheels. As built, the leading coupled axle had flangeless wheels, but it was subsequently retyred with flanges.

The NBL-built locomotives were very similar in appearance to the Class 3B, with running boards which curved down below the cab at the rear and down to meet the buffer beam at the front. The only major design alteration between the NBL and BP locomotive orders was to the cab. With the earlier cabs, many drivers wore leather guards on their left legs to protect them from the heat when the fire door was open. The BP-built locomotives had larger and more spacious cabs to provide increased comfort for the enginemen, and running boards which ran straight through to the rear buffer beams.

Tender
This marked the introduction of a standard tender type which, with few modifications, was eventually to be used on all the Hendrie-designed locomotives. The tender bogies were interchangeable with other tender types operating in the Transvaal and Orange Free State at the time, while its centre longitudinal frame members were carried through unbroken from buffer to buffer. The arrangement of the buffing gear between engine and tender was the result of a long series of experiments, made with the view to avoid excessive fore and aft action between engine and tender while running at high speed.

Watson standard boilers
During the 1930s, many serving locomotives were reboilered with a standard boiler type designed by then CME A.G. Watson as part of his standardisation policy. Such Watson Standard reboilered locomotives were reclassified by adding an "R" suffix to their classification.

From 1935, all 46 Class 12 locomotives were eventually reboilered with Watson Standard no. 2 boilers and reclassified to Class 12R. In the process, they were also equipped with Watson cabs with their distinctive slanted fronts to facilitate access to the firebox side stays, compared to the vertical fronts of the original cabs. In the case of the NBL-built locomotives, the reboilered engines were also fitted with running boards which continued straight through underneath their cabs.

At the same time, the footplate was extended at the back end, in the form of a platform overhanging the tender, which dispensed with the usual fall plate between engine and tender. A handrail was provided, passing round the back of the footplate without impeding the stoker's access to the coal bunker, an arrangement which was subsequently adopted as standard practice. It gave the stoker a much more stable foothold and reduced the risk to the crew in the event of a broken intermediate drawbar.

Their original boilers were fitted with Ramsbottom safety valves, while the Watson Standard boilers were fitted with Pop safety valves. An obvious difference between an original and a Watson Standard reboilered locomotive is usually a rectangular regulator cover, just to the rear of the chimney on the reboilered locomotive. In the case of the Class 12 engines, two even more obvious differences are the Watson cab and the absence of the Belpaire firebox hump between the cab and boiler on the reboilered locomotives.

Service

South African Railways
The locomotives gave outstanding performance with low maintenance costs. They proved to be most successful in the service they had been designed for, handling loads of 1,400 tons and doing the return trip between Witbank and Germiston in one day. This compared favourably with the 2-6-6-0 and 2-6-6-2 Mallet locomotives which, while able to handle 1,600 tons, could not make a round trip in one day.

They were also used around Ladysmith in Natal. In the 1940s, the Natal locomotives were relocated to the Orange Free State, where some were shedded at Bloemfontein and at Bethlehem, all in shunting service. The Transvaal had a large contingent stationed at Springs, Germiston and Krugersdorp, also mainly used for shunting.

By the 1950s, some were allocated to the Cape Midland system, stationed at Sydenham in Port Elizabeth. Until the Midland received Class 15F locomotives in 1957, they worked the mainline section to Cradock. Even though they were subsequently allocated to dock shunting and yard work in the New Brighton marshalling yards, they still assisted with mainline work when required and, in spite of their small  diameter coupled wheels, were comfortable at  when employed in tandem with the larger Class 15F.

Towards the end of the 1950s, the traditional Class 6 and occasionally Class 3R carriage-yard pilots at Bloemfontein made way for the much sturdier Class 12R which were displaced by Class 15Fs on the Cape Midland mainline. Although they had been drafted in for these old-age duties, the phenomenal growth in traffic during the 1960s had the result that the Class 12R were also frequently used for road jobs on the Kroonstad as well as the Bethlehem-Harrismith mainlines.

Zambian Railways
Ten Class 12R locomotives were briefly hired to the Zambian Railways during a peak in that country's perpetual diesel motive power crisis in 1980, but were soon returned since the Zambian knowledge base on steam maintenance had virtually disappeared by then.

Industrial
For some reason, few Class 12 locomotives ended up in industrial service despite their evident suitability for such work. Only five were sold into private service.
 NBL-built no. 1510 went to Umgala Colliery at Utrecht as no. 7.
 NBL-built no. 1511 went to Middelplaas Manganese as no. SL001.
 NBL-built no. 1515 went first to Tweefontein Colliery and later to Witbank Consolidated Coal Mine.
 BP-built no. 1863 and 1864 went to Middelplaas Manganese as numbers SL002 and SL003 respectively.

Works numbers
The Class 12 builders, years built and works numbers are listed in the table.

Preservation

Illustration
The main picture shows NBL-built Class 12R no. 1505. An unmodified locomotive with its Belpaire firebox and reboilered locomotives from both manufacturers are shown below.

References

1700
1700
1700
4-8-2 locomotives
2D1 locomotives
NBL locomotives
Beyer, Peacock locomotives
Cape gauge railway locomotives
Railway locomotives introduced in 1912
1912 in South Africa